Richard William "Richie" Taylor (born 20 June 1951) is an English former professional footballer who played as a winger in the Football League for Sunderland and York City.

References

1951 births
Living people
Footballers from Tyne and Wear
English footballers
Association football wingers
Sunderland A.F.C. players
York City F.C. players
English Football League players